Keechaka Vadham is an Indian silent film produced, directed, filmed and edited by R. Nataraja Mudaliar. The first film to have been made in South India, it was shot in five weeks at Nataraja Mudaliar's production house, India Film Company. As the members of the cast were Tamils, Keechaka Vadham is considered to be the first Tamil film. No print of it is known to have survived, making it a lost film.

The screenplay, written by C. Rangavadivelu, is based on an episode from the Virata Parva segment of the Hindu epic Mahabharata, focusing on Keechaka's attempts to woo Draupadi. The film stars Raju Mudaliar and Jeevarathnam as the central characters.

Released in the late 1910s, Keechaka Vadham was commercially successful and received positive critical feedback. The film's success prompted Nataraja Mudaliar to make a series of similar historical films, which laid the foundation for the South Indian cinema industry and led to his being recognised as "the father of Tamil cinema." Nataraja Mudaliar's works were an inspiration to other filmmakers including Raghupathi Surya Prakasa and J. C. Daniel.

Plot 
Keechaka, the commander of King Virata's forces, attempts to woo and marry Draupadi by any means necessary; he even tries to molest Draupadi, prompting her to tell Bhima, her husband and one of the Pandava brothers, about it. Later, when Keechaka meets Draupadi, she requests him to rendezvous with her at a secret hiding place. He arrives there, only to find Bhima instead of Draupadi; Bhima kills him.

Cast 
Raju Mudaliar as Keechaka
Jeevarathnam as Draupadi

Production

Development 

R. Nataraja Mudaliar, a car dealer who was based in Madras, developed an interest in motion pictures after watching Dadasaheb Phalke's 1913 mythological film, Raja Harishchandra at the Gaiety theatre in Madras. The former then learned the basics of photography and filmmaking from Stewart Smith, a Poona-based British cinematographer who had worked on a documentary that chronicled the viceroyship of Lord Curzon
(1899–1905). Nataraja Mudaliar bought a Williamson 35 mm camera and printer from Mooppanar, a wealthy landowner based in Thanjavur, for 1,800. In 1915, he established the India Film Company, which was South India's first production company. He then set up a film studio on Miller's Road in Purasawalkam with the help of business associates who invested in his production house.

Nataraja Mudaliar sought advice from his friend, theatrical artist Pammal Sambandha Mudaliar, who suggested that he depict the story of Draupadi and Keechaka from the Virata Parva segment of the Hindu epic Mahabharata. Some of Nataraja Mudaliar's relatives objected, feeling that it was an inappropriate story for his debut venture, but Sambandha Mudaliar persuaded him to proceed with making the film as audiences were familiar with the story. Attorney C. Rangavadivelu, a close friend of Nataraja Mudaliar, assisted him in writing the screenplay as the latter was not a writer by profession. The paintings of Raja Ravi Varma provided Nataraja Mudaliar with a source of inspiration for recreating the story on celluloid. Nataraja Mudaliar cast stage actors Raju Mudaliar and Jeevarathnam as Keechaka and Draupadi, respectively.

Filming 
Keechaka Vadham was filmed on a budget of 35,000 (worth 6 crore in 2021 prices). Principal photography began in 1916–1917, and the film was shot over 35–37 days. Nataraja Mudaliar imported the film stock from London with the help of an Englishman named Carpenter, who worked for the Bombay division of the photographic technology company, Kodak. Film historian Randor Guy noted in his 1997 book Starlight Starbright: The Early Tamil Cinema that a thin white piece of cloth was used as a ceiling for filming and sunlight was filtered through it onto the floor. Rangavadivelu was also experienced in playing female roles on stage for the Suguna Vilasa Sabha, and coached the artists on set. The film's production, cinematography and editing were handled by Nataraja Mudaliar himself.

The film was shot with a speed of 16 frames per second, which was the standard rate for a silent film, at the India Film Company, with intertitles in English, Tamil and Hindi. The Tamil and Hindi intertitles were written by Sambandha Mudaliar and Devdas Gandhi respectively, while Nataraja Mudaliar wrote the English intertitles himself with the assistance of Guruswami Mudaliar and Thiruvengada Mudaliar, a professor from Pachaiyappa's College.

Keechaka Vadham was the first film made in South India; as the cast was Tamil, it is also the first Tamil film. According to Guy, Nataraja Mudaliar established a laboratory in Bangalore to process the film negatives since there was no film laboratory in Madras. Nataraja Mudaliar believed that Bangalore's colder climate "would be kind to his exposed film stock"; he processed the film negatives there each weekend and returned on Monday morning to resume filming.

Release, reception and legacy 
According to Muthiah, Keechaka Vadham was first released at the Elphinstone Theatre in Madras; the film netted 50,000 after being screened in India, Burma, Ceylon, the Federated Malay States and Singapore. The film yielded 15,000 which Muthiah noted to be a "tidy profit in those days." Writer Firoze Rangoonwalla notes that a reviewer for The Mail praised the film: "It has been prepared with great care and is drawing full houses". Guy pointed out that with the film's critical and commercial success, Nataraja Mudaliar had "created history". Since no print is known to have survived, it appears to be a lost film.

Keechaka Vadhams success inspired Nataraja Mudaliar to make a series of films based on Hindu mythology: Draupadi Vastrapaharanam (1918), Lava Kusa (1919), Shiva Leela (1919), Rukmini Satyabhama (1922) and Mahi Ravana (1923). He retired from filmmaking in 1923 after a fire killed his son and destroyed his production house. Nataraja Mudaliar is widely regarded as "the father of Tamil cinema," and his films helped lay the foundation for the South Indian cinema industry; his works inspired Raghupathi Surya Prakasa, the son of Raghupathi Venkaiah Naidu, and J. C. Daniel.

See also 
 Raja Harishchandra, the first Indian silent film
 Kalidas, the first sound film in Tamil and Telugu cinema
 List of lost films

Notes

References

Bibliography

Books

Newspapers

Websites

External links 
 

1910s directorial debut films
1910s historical films
1910s in Indian cinema
1910s lost films
Films based on the Mahabharata
Hindu mythological films
Indian black-and-white films
Indian historical films
Indian silent films
Lost Indian films